Aparesh Kumar Singh (born 7 July 1965) is an Indian Judge. Presently, he is a judge of Jharkhand High Court. He was the Acting Chief Justice of Jharkhand High Court.

References 

Indian judges
1965 births
Living people